In mathematics, and especially differential geometry, an affine sphere is a hypersurface for which the affine normals all intersect in a single point. The term affine sphere is used because they play an analogous role in affine differential geometry to that of ordinary spheres in Euclidean differential geometry.

An affine sphere is called improper if all of the affine normals are constant. In that case, the intersection point mentioned above lies on the hyperplane at infinity.

Affine spheres have been the subject of much investigation, with many hundreds of research articles devoted to their study.

Examples 

 All quadrics are affine spheres; the quadrics that are also improper affine spheres are the paraboloids.
 If ƒ is a smooth function on the plane and the determinant of the Hessian matrix is ±1 then the graph of ƒ in three-space is an improper affine sphere.

References 

Differential geometry